Derek Freitas Ribeiro (born 2 December 1997), known as Derek, is a Brazilian professional footballer who plays as a forward for Guarani.

References

External links
 Statistics at UAF website (Ukr)
 Profile on Metalist 1925 Kharkiv official website
 

1997 births
Living people
Footballers from Rio de Janeiro (city)
Brazilian footballers
Brazilian expatriate footballers
Association football forwards
Artsul Futebol Clube players
Madureira Esporte Clube players
FC Metalist 1925 Kharkiv players
Associação Chapecoense de Futebol players
Ukrainian First League players
Campeonato Brasileiro Série D players
Expatriate footballers in Ukraine
Brazilian expatriate sportspeople in Ukraine